was a Japanese photographer. He served as the founding editor-in-chief of the photography magazine Geijutsu shashin kenkyu ("Art Photography Studies").

References

Japanese photographers
1887 births
1948 deaths